is a mountain located on Ie Island in Ie, Okinawa. The mountain rises  on Iejima to the northwest of Okinawa Island and is the highest point on the island. Mount Gusuku is considered a symbol of Iejima due to its distinctive conical shape.

The mountain sits on the eastern side of the island and is clearly visible from the main island of Okinawa and the East China Sea. The outline of Mount Gusuku can be clearly seen from the Motobu Peninsula on Okinawa Island and Sesoko Island. The mountain has historically served as a nautical landmark and appears in nautical charts from the medieval period.

Etymology

The Japanese reading for the mountain is "Shiro-yama;" however, in Okinawan, it is pronounced "Gusuku-yama."

Geology

Mount Gusuku is 70 million years older than the rest of Iejima. The mountain was formed by a unique offscrape phenomenon: an older level of bedrock was displaced by newer bedrock to form an admixture of the two.

Utaki

Mount Gusuku is a site considered sacred in the Ryukyuan religion. An utaki, or shrine of the Ryukyuan religion, is located halfway to the summit of the mountain, and the path leading to the shrine is marked by torii gates. Historically the utaki at Mount Gusuku has been utilized for prayers for safe sea voyages and crops.

References

Mountains of Okinawa Prefecture